is a football stadium located in Iwata City, Shizuoka Prefecture, Japan, owned by Yamaha Motors, next to whose plant it is located, and was purpose-designed for use with soccer and rugby union.

It is the home ground for the J1 League club Júbilo Iwata, and the rugby union team Shizuoka Blue Revs. The stadium has a seating capacity of 15,165 people.

References

External links
Yamaha home page with map

Football venues in Japan
Rugby union stadiums in Japan
Júbilo Iwata
Sports venues in Shizuoka Prefecture
Yamaha Corporation
Sports venues completed in 1978
1978 establishments in Japan
Iwata, Shizuoka